Titanium chloride may refer to:

 Titanium tetrachloride (titanium(IV) chloride), TiCl
 Titanium trichloride (titanium(III) chloride), TiCl
 Titanium dichloride (titanium(II) chloride), TiCl